The Lethbridge Pronghorns, are the athletic teams that represent the University of Lethbridge in Lethbridge, Alberta, Canada. They have men's and women's teams that compete in U Sports basketball,  rugby union, soccer, swimming, and track and field. Previously, they competed in ice hockey until 2020.<ref
name=Teams></ref> They are named after the pronghorn.

Teams

Basketball
The Men's basketball team is currently coached by James McKinnon in the interim.

The Women's basketball team is currently coached by Dave Waknuk.

Hockey
In 1994 the men's team won the University Cup. The Pronghorns, in partnership with the City of Lethbridge, hosted the 2019 edition of the University Cup at the ENMAX Centre

The hockey program was discontinued in 2020.

Murray Nystrom was the last head coach of the men's hockey team

Doug Paisley was the last head coach of the women's hockey team.

Soccer

Randy Bardock is currently the head coach of the men's Soccer team.

Isla Wong and Jack Reddy are currently co-head coaches of the women's soccer team.

Rugby
The most successful of all athletic programs at the University of Lethbridge is the women's rugby team. The rugby team won the Molinex Trophy in 2007, 2008 and 2009. In addition to three National titles, the team has also won a silver and bronze medal at the National tournament. Six consecutive Canada West titles have been won by the Pronghorns.

Neil Langevin is currently the head coach of the women's rugby team.

Track and field
In the 2004/2005 season, Jim Steacy remained undefeated in the weight throw versus CIS competition, claiming gold in both the Canada West and CIS Championships while breaking his own record in both events. For the first time in his CIS career, Steacy won both the Canada West and CIS shot put titles. For the second straight year he was named the CIS field athlete of the year at nationals.

Larry Steinke is currently the head coach of the track and field team.

Swimming
The University of Lethbridge swim team carries a long tradition of high performance swimming into each new season. The 2004–2005 season saw one of their strongest teams ever.

Seven swimmers competed at the 2005 CIS championships in Edmonton. Rookie Richard Hortness won the 100-meter freestyle race with a time of 49.81 and placed second in the 50-meter free with a time of 22.89. Hortness was selected to become a member of the Canadian National Team and competed in Turkey in August 2005.

Peter Schori is currently the head coach of the swim team.

Judo
At the Alberta Judo Provincials in 2005, Tanner Mair topped the ten other competitors in his weight class to win the gold. In the blue and under 81 kg class, Mair won all his matches by throw (ippon). Mair also received the best technician award for the second consecutive year. In the 2004/2005 season, Mair has placed first in all six tournaments he has entered.

Club Teams
In addition to the varsity sports teams, the University of Lethbridge also hosts club teams for Golf, Ringette, and Curling.

International
The following Pronghorns student-athletes have played in international competition.
Ashley Patzer : Rugby – 2015 Pan American Games, 2016 Rio Summer Olympics

Awards and honors

Athletes of the Year
This is an incomplete list
Awards are given out at the university's annual Blue and Gold Banquet.

Canada West Hall of Fame
Women's Rugby Team, 2006–11: Canada West Hall of Fame – 2019 Inductee

U Sports Awards
Ashley Patzer: U Sports National Rugby Championships Most Valuable Player (2008)
Ashley Patzer: U Sports Rugby Rookie of the Year (2005)
Ashley Patzer: U Sports Rugby Athlete of the Year (2006, 2009)

References

External links
 
 Pronghorns Hall of Fame

Sport in Lethbridge
U Sports teams in Alberta
Pronghorns
U Sports teams